In seven-dimensional geometry, a cantellated 7-cube is a convex uniform 7-polytope, being a cantellation of the regular 7-cube.

There are 10 degrees of cantellation for the 7-cube, including truncations. 4 are most simply constructible from the dual 7-orthoplex.

Cantellated 7-cube

Alternate names
 Small rhombated hepteract (acronym: sersa) (Jonathan Bowers)

Images

Bicantellated 7-cube

Alternate names
 Small birhombated hepteract (acronym: sibrosa) (Jonathan Bowers)

Images

Tricantellated 7-cube

Alternate names
 Small trirhombihepteractihecatonicosoctaexon (acronym: strasaz) (Jonathan Bowers)

Images

Cantitruncated 7-cube

Alternate names
 Great rhombated hepteract (acronym: gersa) (Jonathan Bowers)

Images 

It is fifth in a series of cantitruncated hypercubes:

Bicantitruncated 7-cube

Alternate names
 Great birhombated hepteract (acronym: gibrosa) (Jonathan Bowers)

Images

Tricantitruncated 7-cube

Alternate names
 Great trirhombihepteractihecatonicosoctaexon (acronym: gotrasaz) (Jonathan Bowers)

Images

Related polytopes 

These polytopes are from a family of 127 uniform 7-polytopes with B7 symmetry.

See also
 List of B7 polytopes

Notes

References
 H.S.M. Coxeter:
 H.S.M. Coxeter, Regular Polytopes, 3rd Edition, Dover New York, 1973
 Kaleidoscopes: Selected Writings of H.S.M. Coxeter, edited by F. Arthur Sherk, Peter McMullen, Anthony C. Thompson, Asia Ivic Weiss, Wiley-Interscience Publication, 1995,  
 (Paper 22) H.S.M. Coxeter, Regular and Semi Regular Polytopes I, [Math. Zeit. 46 (1940) 380-407, MR 2,10]
 (Paper 23) H.S.M. Coxeter, Regular and Semi-Regular Polytopes II, [Math. Zeit. 188 (1985) 559-591]
 (Paper 24) H.S.M. Coxeter, Regular and Semi-Regular Polytopes III, [Math. Zeit. 200 (1988) 3-45]
 Norman Johnson Uniform Polytopes, Manuscript (1991)
 N.W. Johnson: The Theory of Uniform Polytopes and Honeycombs, Ph.D.
  x3o3x3o3o3o4o- sersa, o3x3o3x3o3o4o - sibrosa, o3o3x3o3x3o4o - strasaz, x3x3x3o3o3o4o - gersa, o3x3x3x3o3o4o - gibrosa, o3o3x3x3x3o4o - gotrasaz

External links 
 Polytopes of Various Dimensions
 Multi-dimensional Glossary

7-polytopes